Heritage Village is a census-designated place (CDP) in the town of Southbury in New Haven County, Connecticut, United States.  The population was 3,736 at the 2010 census.

Geography

Demographics
As of the census of 2000, there were 3,435 people, 2,261 households, and 976 families residing in the CDP. The racial makeup of the CDP was 99.01% White, 0.20% African American, 0.03% Native American, 0.32% Asian, 0.09% from other races, and 0.35% from two or more races. Hispanic or Latino of any race were 0.67% of the population.

There were 2,261 households, out of which 1.9% had children under the age of 18 living with them, 39.5% were married couples living together, 3.2% had a female householder with no husband present, and 56.8% were non-families. 54.6% of all households were made up of individuals, and 47.9% had someone living alone who was 65 years of age or older.  The average household size was 1.52 and the average family size was 2.15.  Technically, no children under 18 years are allowed to live in Heritage Village.

In the CDP, the population was spread out, with 2.7% under the age of 18, 0.7% from 18 to 24, 3.2% from 25 to 44, 14.7% from 45 to 64, and 78.7% who were 65 years of age or older.  The median age was 75 years. For every 100 females, there were 58.1 males.  For every 100 females age 18 and over, there were 57.4 males.

The median income for a household in the CDP was $38,525, and the median income for a family was $51,714. Males had a median income of $44,261 versus $31,250 for females. The per capita income for the CDP was $30,876.  About 1.8% of families and 3.1% of the population were below the poverty line, including none of those under age 18 and 2.9% of those age 65 or over.

References

Southbury, Connecticut
Census-designated places in New Haven County, Connecticut
Retirement communities
Census-designated places in Connecticut